Jørgen Jørgensen (1780–1841) was a Danish adventurer during the Age of Revolution

Jørgen Jørgensen may also refer to:

 Jørgen Jørgensen (politician) (1888–1974), Danish politician
 Jørgen Jørgensen (philosopher) (1894–1969)
 Jørgen Jørgensen (swimmer) (1914–1961), Danish swimmer
 Jørgen Jørgensen (cyclist) (born 1936), Danish cyclist 
 Jørgen Jørgensen (philatelist) (born 1944), Danish philatelist
 Jørgen Jørgensen (footballer)